Tim Tam (April 19, 1955 – July 30, 1982) was a champion American Thoroughbred racehorse who won the 1958 Kentucky Derby and Preakness Stakes, but fell short of winning the Triple Crown of American thoroughbred horse racing, coming in second place in the Belmont Stakes.  He was inducted into the Hall of Fame.

Background
TimTam was a dark bay horse sired by Tom Fool and out of Two Lea (both sire and dam listed on the Top 100 U.S. Racehorses of the 20th Century; Tom Fool at #11 and Two Lea at #77), the dark bay colt was owned and bred by Calumet Farm. Tim Tam was trained by Jimmy Jones.

Racing career
Racing at age two, Tim Tam finished unplaced in his only start of 1957, earning just $275.00.

As a three-year-old, Tim Tam won the Everglades Stakes, the Flamingo Stakes, the Fountain of Youth Stakes, the Florida Derby, the Forerunner Stakes and the Derby Trial en route to winning the 1958 Kentucky Derby.

After winning the Preakness Stakes, Tim Tam was considered to have a strong chance to capture the American Triple Crown. However, in the Belmont Stakes, coming down the home stretch toward the lead that seemed to assure victory, Tim Tam fractured a sesamoid bone and hobbled the last yards across the finish line in second place. His injury ended his career but he went on to be a successful sire.

Stud record
At stud Tim Tam sired 14 stakes race winners, among them the Hall of Fame filly Tosmah. His legacy would become even more important as the damsire of three outstanding runners:

Mac Diarmida (1975) : The American Champion Male Turf Horse of 1978 whose wins included the prestigious Canadian International Championship and Washington, D.C. International Stakes;

Davona Dale (1976) : In 1979 she won the American Triple Tiara of Thoroughbred Racing and was voted American Champion Three-Year-Old Filly. In 1985 she was inducted into the U. S. Racing Hall of Fame;

Before Dawn (1979) : The 1981 American Champion Two-Year-Old Filly.

In 1980 Tim Tam was retired from stud duty. On Monday, July 25, 1982 he suffered a heart attack and on Friday July 30 was euthanized. He was buried in the Calumet Farm equine cemetery.

Honors
Although his racing season was cut short, Tim Tam still was elected American Champion Three-Year-Old Male Horse.

In 1985, Tim Tam was inducted into the National Museum of Racing and Hall of Fame.

The Tim Tam chocolate biscuit manufactured by Arnott's in Australia was named after the horse.

Breeding

 Tim Tam was inbred 3 × 3 to Bull Dog, meaning that this stallion appears twice in the third generation of his pedigree.

References

1955 racehorse births
1982 racehorse deaths
Racehorses bred in Kentucky
Kentucky Derby winners
Preakness Stakes winners
United States Thoroughbred Racing Hall of Fame inductees
Eclipse Award winners
Thoroughbred family 23-b